María Gabriela Pazos (born September 20, 1967) is a retired female field hockey player from Argentina. She was a member of the Women's National Team that finished in seventh place at the 1988 Summer Olympics in Seoul, South Korea. Three years later she claimed the gold medal at the Pan American Games in Havana, Cuba.

References 
  sports-reference
  santafedeportivo

External links
 

1967 births
Living people
Argentine female field hockey players
Field hockey players at the 1988 Summer Olympics
Olympic field hockey players of Argentina
Pan American Games gold medalists for Argentina
Pan American Games medalists in field hockey
Field hockey players at the 1991 Pan American Games
Medalists at the 1991 Pan American Games